Thomas Edison has appeared in popular culture as a character in novels, films, comics and video games. His prolific inventing helped make him an icon and he has made appearances in popular culture during his lifetime down to the present day.  He is often portrayed in popular culture as an adversary of Nikola Tesla.

Biographical works
 Young Tom Edison (1940), played by Mickey Rooney.
 Edison, the Man (1940), played by Spencer Tracy.
 "The Electric Sunshine Man" is a musical for young voices about the life, times, and inventions of Thomas Edison; generally performed by youth choral groups in schools.
 The Schoolhouse Rock song "Mother Necessity" featured Thomas Edison first as a child intending to be an inventor when he grows up "to make a lamp to help my mommy see..Wowee!/What an excellent application of electricity!" and then as a smart, rich man.
 Edison occasionally appeared in caricature form on Histeria! His first major appearance was in a sketch in which he comes up with the light bulb while his nephew (played by Loud Kiddington) and his friends fool around in his office. The show also featured a song about Edison's partnership with Henry Ford.
 "Edison's Medicine" is a song by the band Tesla from the album Psychotic Supper, which features the war of the currents between Edison's DC and Tesla's AC.
 "The Wizard of Menlo Park" is a song by Chumbawamba on their album Un.
 The song "Edison" by the Bee Gees from their 1969 album Odessa is a reference about Thomas Edison.
 Czech poet Vítězslav Nezval wrote a lengthy epic poem titled Edison (1930), in which Edison is celebrated and apostrophed there as symbol of courage in search of meaning of life in modern civilisation.  This work is considered to be one of the best poems of modern Czech literature.
Camping with Henry and Tom, a fictional 1995 play based on Edison's camping trips with Henry Ford, written by Mark St. Germain. It was first presented at Lucille Lortel Theatre, New York.
 The Current War (2017, 2019 director's cut) is a biographical film, starring Benedict Cumberbatch as Edison.

Fantasy and science fiction
 Edisonade is a category of fantastic fiction with young inventors travelling to distant parts and having adventures.  Not only did the genre use his name, but a number of Thomas/Tom Edisons appeared in the early adventures.
 The Future Eve (L'Ève Future), an 1886 novel by Auguste Villiers de l'Isle-Adam that popularized the term "android", portrays Edison creating what he argues is the perfect woman, the android Hadaly, in order to cure his friend Lord Ewald's infatuation with a singer named Alicia, who is represented as shallow and immoral.
Edison's Conquest of Mars by Garrett P. Serviss (1898) is an unofficial sequel to The War of the Worlds in which Edison finds and reverse engineers Martian technology.
 "Tom Edison's Shaggy Dog" in Welcome to the Monkey House by Kurt Vonnegut (1953) is a short story about Edison's accidental discovery that dogs have superhuman intelligence (and can talk) while working on an intelligence analyzer invention.  Edison's dog "Sparky" reveals that dogs keep their intelligence a closely guarded secret. The story also divulges that it was Sparky who suggested to Edison the crucial component of the first incandescent light bulb.
 And Having Writ..., a 1978 alternate universe novel by Donald R. Bensen, features four aliens stranded on Earth whose comic misadventures lead to Edison being chosen by the Republican National Committee to run for President of the United States instead of Secretary of War William Howard Taft in 1908. He wins and becomes the 27th president. Prior to becoming president, the four aliens invent an effective hearing aid to help Edison with his poor hearing. The following year in 1909, Edison has the aliens placed under house arrest in New York so that he can pry technological secrets from them. They escape (thanks to former president Theodore Roosevelt), however, and head to Europe, and Edison is obliged to dispatch Marines to go after them. When he finally has them in his clutches again, Edison realizes that the amount of technology the aliens possess would, if widely distributed, cause widespread upheaval. In 1912, Edison decides not to run for a second term as he would rather go back to inventing. He is succeeded by former president Theodore Roosevelt, who also preceded him.
 In the Japanese tokusatsu Kamen Rider Ghost, the ghost of Thomas Edison helps the main character Takeru Tenkuji/Kamen Rider Ghost to unite the 15 Heroic Spirits and to access his electricity/gun-wielding Edison Damashii form.
 In the Assassin's Creed video game series, Edison is portrayed as a member of The Knights Templar and one of the founders of the Abstergo Industries, attempting to discredit Nikola Tesla, an ally of the Assassins Order.
 A Voyagers! episode involving Edison shows, in an instance of history "going wrong", Edison and his team trying to make a light bulb filament by rolling lamp black; they all fail, and when Jeffrey tears his shirt, Edison offers to repair it, then studies the thread as a potential filament.
 Back in Time With Thomas Edison a 2001 book by Dan Gutman, wherein a thirteen-year-old boy named "Qwerty" Stevens discovers a secret machine built by Edison himself.
 JLA: Age of Wonder (2003) was a two-issue mini-series from DC's Elseworlds line, in which Superman landed in Kansas in the 1850s and emerged on the world stage at the 1876 Centennial Exposition. He teams up with Edison but ends up working with Tesla.
 Tales From the Bully Pulpit (2004) by Benito Cereno is a graphic novel containing the time travel adventures of Thomas Edison and Theodore Roosevelt.
 The Five Fists of Science is a 2006 graphic novel in which Edison is the villain, whose evil plans are thwarted by Nikola Tesla and Mark Twain.
 The role-playing game Fate/Grand Order has Edison appear as a Caster class Servant summoned by the Holy Grail in the E Pluribus Unum chapter, set in 1783. He works with Helena Blavatsky and Karna in fighting the Celtic takeover of the eastern United States, and is an antagonist of Geronimo's faction before becoming an ally. His feud with Tesla, who appeared earlier as an Archer class Servant, is a running joke throughout the game.
 The Doctor Who series 12 fourth episode "Nikola Tesla's Night of Terror" featured Thomas Edison as portrayed by Robert Glenister.

Historical fiction
 In the Young Indiana Jones Chronicles episode "Princeton, February 1916", Indiana Jones investigates the theft of Edison's plans for an electric car. Edison is portrayed by Richard K Olsen.
 The book "Hey Kid, Want to Buy a Bridge?" from The Time Warp Trio book series by Jon Scieszka, as well as the namesake episode from the companion television series, featured Edison as a character.
 The plot of Night of the New Magicians from the Magic Tree House book series by Mary Pope Osborne had the protagonists searching the 1889 World's Fair for four of the world's great visionaries including Edison.

Characters based on Edison
 Expiration Date by Tim Powers in which a boy possessed by the spirit of Thomas Edison is hunted through Los Angeles by people wanting to consume the ghost he carries.
The Wizard of Oz (aka Oscar Diggs), from the books of the same, name is said to have been partly inspired by Thomas Edison, who writer L. Frank Baum refereed to as "The Wizard".

Other references to Edison
 Edison appears in the second series of YouTube series Epic Rap Battles of History, in a rap battle against Nikola Tesla.
 He is one of the antagonists of the web series Super Science Friends.
 Edison appears in and lends his name to The Edison Effect, the fourth Professor Bradshaw Mystery by Bernadette Pajer.
 In The Simpsons episode "The Wizard of Evergreen Terrace", Homer is inspired by Edison to become an inventor.
 The first supervillain that Ms. Marvel (Kamala Khan) encountered was The Inventor, a failed clone of Edison whose DNA was contaminated by his creators' pet cockatiel.
 The Bob's Burgers episode "Topsy", in which Louise attempts to recreate the electrocution of Topsy the elephant for her science project.
 An episode of The Big Bang Theory, "The Tesla Recoil", is inspired by the rivalry between Nikola Tesla and Thomas Edison.

See also 
 :Category:Cultural depictions of scientists

References

External links 
 Fantastic Victoriana: E, The 'E' page of the online version of Jess Nevins' Encyclopedia of Fantastic Victoriana which contains two different fictional Thomas/Tom Edisons and an entry on Edisonade

 
Edison, Thomas